Derek Kern is a musician and vocalist. He is a member of The Evan Anthem, and also recorded with Relient K on their Apathetic EP.

In addition to providing vocals, Kern also plays the guitar and keyboards.

References

External links

Year of birth missing (living people)
Living people
American rock keyboardists
American male singers
American rock singers
American rock guitarists
Place of birth missing (living people)
American male guitarists